Anatoly Nikolayevich Levchenko (6 February 1947 – 27 December 1985) was a Soviet fighter pilot in the 655th Fighter Aviation Regiment of the 40th Army of the Turkestan Military District during the Soviet–Afghan War. He was posthumously made a Hero of the Soviet Union after his death in combat, the only Soviet pilot in Afghanistan to receive the award.

Early life 
Levchenko was born in Novonikolayevsky District in 1947 to working class parents, joining the Communist Party of the Soviet Union in 1969.

Military service 
Joining the Soviet Air Force in August 1964, Levchenko served in the 655th Fighter Aviation Regiment (IAP) flying the Mikoyan-Gurevich MiG-23MLD, based at Pärnu in Estonia. This unit was transferred to Kandahar airbase in Afghanistan in 1985, taking over from the 905th IAP, which returned to its home base at Taldy-Kurgan (now known as Taldıqorğan) in July 1985. The 905th IAP had suffered relatively light losses, losing only one aircraft in combat on the 23rd July 1985.

Death 
On the 27th December 1985, while flying a mission over the Salang Pass, Levchenko's aircraft was shot down by anti-aircraft fire from a DShK heavy machine gun, killing him. This was the first combat loss for the 655th IAP, which would go on to lose four more aircraft in that year. The death of Levchenko and three other pilots in similar incidents led the 40th Army's air contingent to re-evaluate their tactics, leading to a new method of landing being employed which required a steep spiral descent made within the airfield's perimeters and the firing of flares on takeoff and landing.

References 

1947 births
1985 deaths
People from Novonikolayevsky District
Heroes of the Soviet Union
Deaths by firearm in Afghanistan
Recipients of the Order of Lenin
Recipients of the Order of the Red Star
Recipients of the Order "For Service to the Homeland in the Armed Forces of the USSR", 3rd class
Soviet military personnel killed in the Soviet-Afghan War
Pilots who performed an aerial ramming
Communist Party of the Soviet Union members
Aviators killed by being shot down
Soviet Air Force officers